ZNGR-FM is a news/talk radio station in Nassau, Bahamas.  The station was launched on April 10, 2012.

Radio stations in the Bahamas
News and talk radio stations
Radio stations established in 2012